Axiagasta is a genus of moths in the family Geometridae.

Species
 Axiagasta rhodobaphes Turner, 1930

References
 Axiagasta at Markku Savela's Lepidoptera and Some Other Life Forms
 

Oenochrominae
Geometridae genera